Sun Peiyuan (born August 8, 1989) is a professional wushu taolu athlete from China. He is regarded as one of the most dominant wushu athletes of the 2010s, having been the first athlete to achieve the new version of the "grand slam" (gold medals at the national championships, National Games of China, Asian Games, World Cup, and the World Wushu Championships).

Career 
Sun started training wushu at the sage of six. In 2003, he was selected to join the Shandong provincial wushu team and in 2009, Sun was admitted into the Physical Education Institute of the Shandong University of Finance and Economics.

Sun's first major appearance was at the 2009 National Games of China where he won two bronze medals. His international debut was two years later at the 2011 World Wushu Championships where he became the world champion in men's daoshu. Two years later, he competed in the 2013 National Games of China and won the silver medal in the changquan all-around event. A year later, he appeared at the 2014 Asian Games and won the gold medal in the men's daoshu and gunshu combined event. He then won a gold medal in changquan at the 2015 World Wushu Championships, followed by a win in the same event at the first Taolu World Cup in 2016. A year later at the 2017 National Games of China, he . Sun then returned to the Asian Games in 2018 and won the gold medal in men's changquan, which was the first medal for China at the 2018 Asian Games.

At the 2021 National Games of China, Sun won the bronze medal in men's chanquan all-around due to a 0.1 point deduction in his changquan routine.

See also 

 List of Asian Games medalists in wushu
China national wushu team

References

External links 

 Athlete profile at the 2018 Asian Games

1989 births
Living people
Chinese martial artists
Chinese wushu practitioners
Wushu practitioners at the 2014 Asian Games
Wushu practitioners at the 2018 Asian Games
Asian Games gold medalists for China
Medalists at the 2014 Asian Games
Medalists at the 2018 Asian Games
Asian Games medalists in wushu